Karl I (30 July 1569 – 12 February 1627), was the first member of the Liechtenstein family to become a Prince of Liechtenstein, thus he was the founder of the Princely Family of Liechtenstein.

Karl was the elder son of Hartmann II, Baron of Liechtenstein (1544–1585) and his wife Countess Anna Maria of Ortenburg (1547–1601). Emperor Rudolf II of the Holy Roman Empire appointed Karl as chief intendant (Obersthofmeister), an important position at his court. Karl held this position until 1607. In a dispute over land between Rudolf II and the heir presumptive to the throne, Archduke Mathias, Karl sided with Mathias, who made Karl a hereditary prince in 1608, in thanks for Karl's aid. 

In 1614, Karl added the Duchy of Troppau to his possessions. In thanks for further aid at the Battle of White Mountain, Karl was appointed to the positions of proconsul and vice-regent of Bohemia in 1622, and he was bestowed with the Order of the Golden Fleece.

He gained the Duchy of Troppau on 28 December 1613 and the Silesian Duchy of Jägerndorf on 15 March 1622, along with much confiscated "rebel property", and he commissioned the ducal hat of Liechtenstein.

He became a Catholic in 1599. In 1605, Karl established the first branch north of the Alps of the Hospitaller Order of Saint John of God, at Feldsberg in Lower Austria (now Valtice, Czech Republic).

He was the 352nd Knight of the Order of the Golden Fleece in Austria. He died in Prague.

Marriage and issue
In 1600, Karl married Anna Maria Šemberová, Baroness of and Černá Hora and Lady of Aussee (1575–1625). They had at least four children:
 
 Princess Anna Maria Franziska (7 December 1601 – 26 April 1640), married Maximilian, Prince of Dietrichstein (1596 – 1655).
 Princess Franziska Barbara (1604–1655), married Wenzel Werner of T'Serclaes, Count of Tilly (1599 – 1653).
 Prince Heinrich (died young).
 Karl Eusebius, Prince of Liechtenstein (11 April 1611 – 5 April 1684).

Ancestry

References 

 
 Article in the ABD
 Official biography

1569 births
1627 deaths
Knights of the Golden Fleece
Princes of Liechtenstein
Converts to Roman Catholicism from Lutheranism